Otobi is a Bangladesh-based furniture manufacturer and retailer. The company was established in 1975 by Nitun Kundu. As of 2020, Otobi was tied with Navana and Nadia for second place among Bangladeshi furniture companies, with a 5 percent market share, behind Hatil, which has a 10 percent share. Otobi also exports furniture. 

In mid 2006, Sabbir Hasan Nasir joined the company as CEO. Bidyut Kumar Basu was made the CEO of the company in 2015. Mr. Sudipta Goswami took over as chief executive officer in 2018 and currently holds the position.

Otobi is also the parent company of Quantum Power Systems Ltd.

See also
 List of companies of Bangladesh

References

External links
Official website

Furniture companies of Bangladesh
Manufacturing companies established in 1975
Bangladeshi brands
1975 establishments in Bangladesh